The Kenya Medical Practitioners, Pharmacists and Dentists Union is a trade union for medical doctors in Kenya. On February 13, 2017, seven union officials were jailed for a month for refusing to end their two-month strike over poor working conditions. The Kenyan opposition criticized the sentencing and blamed the government for the Kenyan health impasse. In solidarity with jailed union officials, private doctors announced a 48 hours strike, starting Wednesday.  The Kenyan appeal court, ordered the release of the jailed union officials, in order to carry negotiations.

References

Healthcare trade unions in Kenya